Spray is a city in Wheeler County, Oregon, United States. The population was 160 at the 2010 census.

History
Spray was named for John Fremont Spray, the community's founder and first postmaster, and his wife, Mary E. Spray. The post office was established in 1900. In that same year, John Spray established a ferry to carry people across the John Day River, and he helped establish a school and a store in the community.

After formation of Wheeler County in 1899, Spray was suggested as a possible county seat. A county-wide election held in 1900 produced 436 votes for Fossil, 267 for Twickenham, and 82 for Spray. In 1958, Spray became the last Wheeler County community to incorporate as a city. John Butler was the first mayor.

Geography
Spray is located along the John Day River in north-central Oregon.

Climate
The average wettest month is May.

Demographics

2010 census
As of the census of 2010, there were 160 people, 69 households, and 49 families residing in the town. The racial makeup of the town was 95.0% White, 0.6% Native American, 2.5% Asian, and 1.9% from two or more races. Hispanic or Latino of any race were 0.6% of the population.

There were 69 households, of which 21.7% had children under the age of 18 living with them, 58.0% were married couples living together, 10.1% had a female householder with no husband present, 2.9% had a male householder with no wife present, and 29.0% were non-families. 24.6% of all households were made up of individuals, and 8.7% had someone living alone who was 65 years of age or older. The average household size was 2.22 and the average family size was 2.61.

The median age in the town was 50.3 years. 19.4% of residents were under the age of 18; 6.3% were between the ages of 18 and 24; 18.8% were from 25 to 44; 28.2% were from 45 to 64; and 27.5% were 65 years of age or older. The gender makeup of the town was 49.4% male and 50.6% female.

2000 census
As of the census of 2000, there were 140 people, 67 households, and 39 families residing in the city. The population density was 618.7 people per square mile (235.0/km). There were 88 housing units at an average density of 388.9 per square mile (147.7/km). The racial makeup of the city was 97.86% White, 0.71% Asian, and 1.43% from two or more races.

There were 67 households, out of which 14.9% had children under the age of 18 living with them, 55.2% were married couples living together, 3.0% had a female householder with no husband present, and 40.3% were non-families. 34.3% of all households were made up of individuals, and 11.9% had someone living alone who was 65 years of age or older. The average household size was 2.00 and the average family size was 2.55.

In the city, the population was spread out, with 18.6% under the age of 18, 3.6% from 18 to 24, 17.9% from 25 to 44, 27.1% from 45 to 64, and 32.9% who were 65 years of age or older. The median age was 51 years. For every 100 females, there were 112.1 males. For every 100 females age 18 and over, there were 93.2 males.

The median income for a household in the city was $23,250, and the median income for a family was $24,500. Males had a median income of $19,250 versus $20,000 for females. The per capita income for the city was $14,955. There were 11.4% of families and 21.0% of the population living below the poverty line, including 43.5% of under eighteens and 13.2% of those over 64.

Annual cultural events
Spray features an annual half marathon and rodeo on Memorial Day weekend. The half marathon begins at Service Creek on Saturday and finishes in downtown Spray. The rodeo parade begins roughly three hours later, followed by the rodeo which continues on Sunday. High school graduation also occurs the week before, and the school year ends the week of the rodeo.

Education

Spray School and the Spray School District headquarters are located in the city. In the 2011−12 school year, 44 students were enrolled in grades Kindergarten through 12.

The county is not a part of a community college district.

References

External links
City of Spray (official website)
Entry for Spray in the Oregon Blue Book

Cities in Oregon
Cities in Wheeler County, Oregon
1900 establishments in Oregon
Populated places established in 1900